Boxing competitions at the 2015 Pan American Games in Toronto  were held from July 18 to 25 at the General Motors Centre (Oshawa Sports Centre) in Oshawa. Due to naming rights the arena was known as the latter for the duration of the games. A total of thirteen boxing events will be held: ten for men and three for women.

Venue

The competitions will take place at the General Motors Centre (Oshawa Sports Centre) located about in the city of Oshawa, about 60 kilometers from the athletes village. The arena will have a reduced capacity (from its normal of about 5,500) of about 3,000 people per session. The venue will also host weightlifting competitions earlier during the games.

New rules 
To harmonise with the rules of amateur boxing decided by the Association Internationale de Boxe Amateur (AIBA), Pan Am Boxing will feature new rules. There will be an introduction of the "10-point must" scoring system used in the pro game, where the winner of each round must be awarded 10 points and the loser a lesser amount, and the elimination of the padded headgear. AIBA new rules want to take away the focus on the head as the key scoring location.
The AIBA, boxing's world body, said removing the headgear would actually make things safer by reducing concussions, and the jury is out on that. Now, the boxer will have to concentrate on the whole body and proper ring tactics. The International Olympic Committee has not as yet decided whether to permit boxing without headgear for Rio in 2016. How thing go in Toronto this year may go a long way to a final decision. AIBA officials are also waiting to see how things go in the men's game before making a decision to take headgear off women fighters.

Competition schedule
The following is the competition schedule for the boxing competitions:

Medal table

Medalists

Men's events

Women's events

Participating nations
A total of 24 countries have qualified athletes. The number of athletes a nation has entered is in parentheses beside the name of the country.

Qualification

A total of 120 boxers (96 male and 24 women) will qualify to compete at the games. The top three boxers in each men's category at the 2015 World Series of Boxing will qualify. The rest of the quotas (including all the women's quotas) will be awarded at a qualification tournament in June 2015. Canada as host nation has an automatic berth in one women's and five men's categories, and will need to qualify in all other categories.

See also
Boxing at the 2016 Summer Olympics

References

 
Boxing at the Pan American Games
Events at the 2015 Pan American Games
Pan American Games